Totò e Peppino divisi a Berlino, internationally released as Toto and Peppino Divided in Berlin, is a 1962 Italian comedy film directed by Giorgio Bianchi.

Plot 
Antonio leaves Italy for Berlin to reach Peppino, who works the miserable job of "magliaro". Since he is very poor, Antonio makes a pact with the daughter of former Nazi admiral Attila Canarinis, who is his perfect double, so that in West Berlin he will be tried by the Americans for war crimes. Antonio escapes from jail, but the troubles for him are not finished, because in East Berlin he is mistaken by the Russians for a secret agent, due to a misinterpretation of the Neapolitan book "La smorfia".

Cast 
Totò: Antonio La Puzza /  Aunt nun / Admiral Attila Canarinis
Peppino De Filippo: Peppino Pagliuca
Nadine Sanders: Greta Canarinis
John Karlsen:  the former attendant of Canarinis
Luigi Pavese: the Russian General
Robert Alda: the judge
Renato Terra: the Russian lawyer
Dante Maggio: magliaro
Carlo Pisacane:  magliaro

References

External links

1962 films
1960s buddy comedy films
Films directed by Giorgio Bianchi
Police detective films
Films with screenplays by Age & Scarpelli
Italian buddy comedy films
Films set in East Germany
Films set in West Germany
Films set in Berlin
Cold War films
Italian satirical films
1962 comedy films
1960s Italian-language films
1960s Italian films